Nims Peak is a sharp rock peak about 3 nautical miles (6 km) northwest of Mount Weihaupt in the Outback Nunataks. Mapped by United States Geological Survey (USGS) from surveys and U.S. Navy air photos, 1959–64. Named by Advisory Committee on Antarctic Names (US-ACAN) for David J. Nims, ionospheric physicist at McMurdo Station, 1968.

Mountains of Victoria Land
Pennell Coast